Ira Willmarth Fisher (October 15, 1833May 4, 1900) was an American farmer, Republican politician, and Wisconsin pioneer.  He was a member of the Wisconsin State Senate, representing Winnebago County in the 1869 and 1870 sessions.

Biography
Ira W. Fisher was born in Addison, Vermont, in October 1833.  He received a common school education, then moved to Wisconsin in 1858, settling at Menasha.  He worked as a mill operator, and was one of the owners of the Star Mills, producing flour and livestock feed.

Fisher was elected to the Wisconsin State Senate in 1868, running on the Republican Party ticket.  He represented all of Winnebago County during the 1869 and 1870 sessions.  While serving in the Senate, in 1869, Fisher was appointed to the Governor's commission to investigate the state's charitable and benevolent institutions.  He did not run for re-election in 1870.

In 1878, Fisher purchased a large farm in Casselton, Dakota Territory, and made that his primary residence for most of the rest of his life.

In 1899, Fisher moved in with his son, Walter, in Minneapolis, due to poor health.  He died there after suffering a stroke on May 4, 1900.

Electoral history

Wisconsin Senate (1868)

| colspan="6" style="text-align:center;background-color: #e9e9e9;"| General Election, November 3, 1868

References

1833 births
1900 deaths
People from Addison, Vermont
People from Menasha, Wisconsin
People of Dakota Territory
Republican Party Wisconsin state senators
Burials in Minnesota
Wisconsin pioneers